One Main Place is a privately owned commercial office building in Downtown Portland, in the U.S. state of Oregon. Completed in 1982, it is the fifteenth tallest building in Portland, and the sixteenth largest by square-foot. Designed in the modern style by Skidmore, Owings and Merrill, it is a concrete and glass tower.

History
The structure was designed by architectural firm Skidmore, Owings and Merrill and built by Hoffman Construction Company, with completion coming in 1982. One Main Place was acquired by the Equitable Life Assurance Society from Marathon Realty U.S. for $35 million in 1995. The pension fund for Los Angeles' police and fire departments bought the office tower in December 1998 for $44.5 million, after having owned 10 percent of the building since the 1995 sale. RREEF Realty Investments (part of Deutsche Bank) purchased the building in 2006 for $69.3 million, and then sold it in January 2010 to KBS REIT II for a reported $57 million. RREEF had attempted to sell the office tower in 2009, but halted efforts in October after bids were lower than anticipated. The deal on the building was anticipated to close in April, but was completed early in February. KBS sold the building in 2014 to New York Life for $86.3 million.

In 2019, Sterling-Pacific Commercial Roofing & Waterproofing was hired by New York Life Insurance Company to replace the original roof on One Main Place. The original roof system lasted for 37 years. It was replaced with an EPDM roofing system from Carlisle. The installation was supervised by legendary roofer, Sean Britt. The project management team was James Drinkward of Sterling-Pacific, Paul Amos of Harper Winn, and Chuck Marvin of RSI Results.

Details
One Main Place is 20 stories tall and has  of space. The building has  of leasable space, making it by area the 16th largest in Portland. The concrete building utilizes a curtain wall. The World Trade Center is directly north and east, while First & Main lies adjacent to the south.

Tenants include law firms, Banner Bank, Yellowpages.com, and Tripwire, a software developer, among others. Tripwire and the Education Northwest are the largest tenants, with the former occupying  of space and Education Northwest taking up almost . The building is decorated each year during the winter holidays, utilizing a different theme each year and using a fireplace located in the lobby as part of the theme. These decorations won a local award in 2002 for its Home for the Holidays theme.

References

External links

Tripwire moving - Portland Business Journal

Office buildings completed in 1982
Skyscraper office buildings in Portland, Oregon
Skidmore, Owings & Merrill buildings
1982 establishments in Oregon